Clausognathiidae is a family of worms belonging to the order Bursovaginoidea.

Genera:
 Clausognathia Sterrer, 1992

References

Gnathostomulida
Platyzoa families